The Niagara Mohawk Building is an art deco classic building in Syracuse, New York. The building was built in 1932 and was headquarters for the Niagara Mohawk Power Corporation, what was "then the nation's largest electric utility company". 

The Art Deco building was designed by Syracuse architect Melvin L. King in a consultation with Buffalo firm Bley and Lyman.

The company has since been acquired by merger into National Grid plc. It was listed on the National Register of Historic Places as the Niagara Hudson Building in 2010.

According to the National Park Service:

The Niagara Hudson Building in Syracuse is an outstanding example of Art Deco architecture and a symbol of the Age of Electricity. Completed in 1932, the building became the headquarters for the nation’s largest electric utility company and expressed the technology of electricity through its modernistic design, material, and extraordinary program of exterior lighting. The design elements applied by architects Melvin L. King and Bley & Lyman transformed a corporate office tower into a widely admired beacon of light and belief in the future. With its central tower and figurative winged sculpture personifying electric lighting, the powerfully sculpted and decorated building offered a symbol of optimism and progress in the context of the Great Depression.

The building was listed on the United States National Register of Historic Places in June 2010. The listing was announced as the featured listing in the National Park Service's weekly list of June 25, 2010. It was nominated by New York State's Board of Historic Preservation for listing on the National Register of Historic Places in December 2009. The Board described the building as "'an outstanding example of Art Deco architecture and a symbol of the Age of Electricity.'"

References

External links
 

Art Deco architecture in New York (state)
Art Deco skyscrapers
Buildings and structures in Syracuse, New York
Commercial buildings completed in 1932
Commercial buildings on the National Register of Historic Places in New York (state)
National Register of Historic Places in Syracuse, New York